Bebugging  (or fault seeding or error seeding) is a popular software engineering technique used in the 1970s to measure test coverage. Known bugs are randomly added to a program source code and the software tester is tasked to find them. The percentage of the known bugs not found gives an indication of the real bugs that remain.

The term "bebugging" was first mentioned in The Psychology of Computer Programming (1970), where Gerald M. Weinberg described the use of the method as a way of training, motivating, and evaluating programmers, not as a measure of faults remaining in a program. The approach was borrowed from the SAGE system, where it was used to keep operators watching radar screens alert. Here's a quote from the original use of the term:

An early application of bebugging was Harlan Mills's fault seeding approach  which was later refined by stratified fault-seeding. These techniques worked by adding a number of known faults to a software system for the purpose of monitoring the rate of detection and removal. This assumed that it is possible to estimate the number of remaining faults in a software system still to be detected by a particular test methodology.

Bebugging is a type of fault injection.

See also

 Fault injection
 Mutation testing

References 

Software testing